Radik Failyevich Yusupov (born 25 January 1993) is a Russian football defender.

Club career
He made his debut in the Russian Football National League for FC Mordovia Saransk on 13 July 2013 in a game against FC Dynamo Saint Petersburg.

References

External links

1993 births
People from Saransk
Sportspeople from Mordovia
Living people
Russian footballers
Association football defenders
FC Mordovia Saransk players
FC Neftekhimik Nizhnekamsk players
FC Volga Ulyanovsk players